Waves of Life and Love (German: Des Lebens und der Liebe Wellen) is a 1921 German silent romance film directed by Lorenz Bätz and starring Fern Andra, Toni Tetzlaff and Leopold von Ledebur.

The film's srts were designed by the art director August Rinaldi.

Cast
 Fern Andra
 Toni Tetzlaff
 Leopold von Ledebur
 Margarete Kupfer
 Erling Hanson

References

Bibliography
 Grange, William. Cultural Chronicle of the Weimar Republic. Scarecrow Press, 2008.

External links

1921 films
Films of the Weimar Republic
Films directed by Lorenz Bätz
German silent feature films
Bavaria Film films
1920s romance films
German romance films
German black-and-white films
1920s German films